Flagstaff is a suburb in north-east Hamilton, New Zealand. It was originally called Dulverton on council plans, but it was officially named Flagstaff in 1986 when it was declared as a suburb. The area was heavily developed in the 1990s.

Sometimes the name Rototuna is used to collectively refer to all of the city north of Wairere Drive and east of the Waikato River, including Flagstaff and its developments of St Petersburg and Magellan Rise.

The name "Flagstaff" comes from the flagstaff that was located on the hillock at the western end of Sylvester Road in the 1870s. A flag was raised by the local farmer when a steamer passed to alert the port authorities in the settlement 7 km further south.

Flagstaff is connected to Pukete by a 5 m wide pedestrian bridge that connects with a series of walkways on both banks of the Waikato River. The suburb is served by a shopping centre with parks for 50 cars. It has 18 shops and a gym.

Two playgrounds serve the new suburbs in northern Flagstaff at Hare Puke Park and Te Huia Reserve.

History 
The District Plan lists two middens in the Te Awa O Katapaki valley.

Like most of western Waikato the land at Flagstaff was confiscated following the 1863 invasion of the Waikato. It was surveyed into 50-acre parcels as grants to militiamen of the Fourth Waikato Regiment.

Roads 
Until Hamilton's suburbs extended to Flagstaff in the 1990s, the only roads through the area were Rototuna School Rd, River Rd and Sylvester Rd. River Road was shown on an 1865 map of the military settlements and extended form Hamilton to Ngāruawāhia by 1879. A request to improve Flagstaff Hill Rd was made in 1909 and it was inspected in 1910. Rototuna School Road was also on the 1865 map and was gravelled in 1909.  In 1908 J. and C. Sylvester asked Kirikiriroa Road Board for a road and by 1917 the Board were planning to improve the road.

Geography 
Southern Flagstaff is in the Te Awa O Katapaki stream valley, which has a  catchment. It has short-finned eels, mosquitofish and common smelt. In 2013 fish passage was improved by a new culvert under River Rd. Flows from the urban area are attenuated by Lake Magellan.

Giant kokopu live the stream. Glaisdale West lakes and wetland were built in 2015 to attenuate flows from the developed area and keep heavy metal run-off from vehicles out of Otama-ngenge stream.

Demographics 

Flagstaff had a population of 9,831 at the 2018 New Zealand census, an increase of 3,933 people (66.7%) since the 2013 census, and an increase of 5,886 people (149.2%) since the 2006 census. There were 3,234 households, comprising 4,695 males and 5,133 females, giving a sex ratio of 0.91 males per female, with 2,373 people (24.1%) aged under 15 years, 1,617 (16.4%) aged 15 to 29, 4,530 (46.1%) aged 30 to 64, and 1,311 (13.3%) aged 65 or older.

Ethnicities were 67.5% European/Pākehā, 9.0% Māori, 1.6% Pacific peoples, 27.3% Asian, and 3.3% other ethnicities. People may identify with more than one ethnicity.

The percentage of people born overseas was 34.7, compared with 27.1% nationally.

Although some people chose not to answer the census's question about religious affiliation, 49.8% had no religion, 35.5% were Christian, 0.3% had Māori religious beliefs, 3.5% were Hindu, 2.0% were Muslim, 1.1% were Buddhist and 3.1% had other religions.

Of those at least 15 years old, 2,406 (32.3%) people had a bachelor's or higher degree, and 912 (12.2%) people had no formal qualifications. 1,905 people (25.5%) earned over $70,000 compared to 17.2% nationally. The employment status of those at least 15 was that 4,026 (54.0%) people were employed full-time, 1,005 (13.5%) were part-time, and 201 (2.7%) were unemployed.

Individual census areas
Flagstaff now encompasses three census areas, North, East and South. For censuses prior to 2018 it formed a single census area. Growth has mostly been in the northern and southern areas since 2006. In 2018 there were still 63 houses being built (48 North, 3 East, 12 South).

In 2018 the main ethnic groups were -

Education

See also
List of streets in Hamilton
Suburbs of Hamilton, New Zealand

References

Suburbs of Hamilton, New Zealand
Populated places on the Waikato River